Kyle Stephen Ward (born December 15, 1984) is a former American football cornerback. He was signed by the Green Bay Packers as an undrafted free agent in 2008. He played college football at Louisiana-Lafayette. In addition, Ward was a member of the Buffalo Bills.

External links
Green Bay Packers
Louisiana-Lafayette Ragin' Cajuns bio
Boise State Broncos bio

1984 births
Living people
Players of American football from Texas
American football cornerbacks
Louisiana Ragin' Cajuns football players
Green Bay Packers players
Mahoning Valley Thunder players
Buffalo Bills players
Texas A&M Aggies football coaches
Boise State Broncos football coaches